Beaver Creek is a  tributary of the Kishwaukee River in northern Illinois.

Course
Beaver Creek flows through central Boone County, Illinois, where the Beaver Creek network generally flows northeast to southwest.  Poplar Grove and Capron are the two major settlements in the Beaver Creek watershed; Candlewick Lake, an unincorporated community, is also found in the watershed.

Description
Beaver Creek drains  and has at least one tributary - known as Mosquito Creek (renamed Meander Creek).

References

Rivers of Boone County, Illinois
Tributaries of the Kishwaukee River
Rivers of Illinois